USS Moinester (FF-1097) was a . The ship was named for LTJG Robert W. Moinester who was killed in action during the Battle of Huế on 31 January 1968 and was posthumously awarded the Silver Star. Moinester was christened by Mrs. Gertrude Mahoney Moinester, the mother of the ship's namesake and ship sponsor.

Design and description
The Knox-class design was derived from the  modified to extend range and without a long-range missile system. They displaced  at full load. Their crew consisted of 13 officers and 211 enlisted men.

The ships were equipped with one Westinghouse geared steam turbine that drove the single propeller shaft.

The Knox-class ships were armed with a 5"/54 caliber Mark 42 gun forward and a single 3-inch/50-caliber gun aft. They mounted an eight-round RUR-5 ASROC launcher between the  gun and the bridge. Close-range anti-submarine defense was provided by two twin  Mk 32 torpedo tubes. The ships were equipped with a torpedo-carrying DASH drone helicopter; its telescoping hangar and landing pad were positioned amidships aft of the MACK. Beginning in the 1970s, the DASH was replaced by a SH-2 Seasprite LAMPS I helicopter and the hangar and landing deck were accordingly enlarged. Most ships also had the  gun replaced by an eight-cell BPDMS missile launcher in the early 1970s.

Construction and career 
Moinester was decommissioned and sold to the Egyptian Navy and became the Egyptian frigate Rasheed (F966).

Awards, citations and campaign ribbons

Notes

References 

 USS Moinester on NavSource.org

External links
USS Moinester (DE 1097)

Navsource images
 A Sailor's Homepage: http://FF1097.dancom.com; alt: http://www.dancom.com/ff1097

 

Knox-class frigates
Ships built in Bridge City, Louisiana
1973 ships
Cold War frigates and destroyer escorts of the United States
Knox-class frigates of the Egyptian Navy
Frigates of Egypt